José Manuel Roca Cases (born 28 February 1976) is a Spanish retired footballer who played as a goalkeeper, and a manager.

Football career
Born in Orihuela, Valencian Community, Roca only played lower league football in his country, representing Real Madrid C, Real Madrid Castilla, Real Murcia, CD Onda, CE Sabadell FC, Palamós CF, Novelda CF, CD Badajoz and Orihuela CF and appearing in 177 Segunda División B games over 11 seasons. In the 1999–2000 campaign he was part of Villarreal CF's roster, but failed to take part in any official matches as the club promoted to La Liga.

At already 32, Roca moved abroad, going on to spend the rest of his career in Greece where he played for Panthrakikos FC, Olympiacos Volou 1937 FC (two spells) and Doxa Drama FC, for a total of 43 Superleague appearances. He retired in 2013 and immediately started coaching his last team, now in the second level.

References

External links

La Preferente Profile

1976 births
Living people
People from Orihuela
Sportspeople from the Province of Alicante
Spanish footballers
Footballers from the Valencian Community
Association football goalkeepers
Segunda División B players
Tercera División players
Real Madrid C footballers
Real Madrid Castilla footballers
Real Murcia players
Villarreal CF players
CE Sabadell FC footballers
Palamós CF footballers
Novelda CF players
CD Badajoz players
Orihuela CF players
Super League Greece players
Panthrakikos F.C. players
Olympiacos Volos F.C. players
Doxa Drama F.C. players
Spain youth international footballers
Spanish expatriate footballers
Expatriate footballers in Greece
Spanish expatriate sportspeople in Greece
Spanish football managers
Super League Greece managers
Olympiacos Volos F.C. managers
Iraklis Thessaloniki F.C. managers
Pafos FC managers
Segunda División B managers
CF Villanovense managers
Seinäjoen Jalkapallokerho managers
Spanish expatriate football managers
Expatriate football managers in Greece
Expatriate football managers in Cyprus
Expatriate football managers in Finland